Salmo is an unincorporated community in Bayfield County, Wisconsin, United States.

Wisconsin Highway 13 serves as a main route in the community.  Salmo is located 3 miles southwest of the city of Bayfield, in the town of Bayfield.

The community is also located 19 miles north of the city of Ashland.

History
The community was named after Salmo, a genus of fish which includes the Atlantic salmon.

The Bayfield Fish Hatchery, which is listed on the National Register of Historic Places, is located in Salmo.

References

Unincorporated communities in Bayfield County, Wisconsin
Unincorporated communities in Wisconsin